KGOL (1180 AM) is a commercial radio station, licensed to Humble, Texas, and serving Greater Houston. 

KGOL is one of only two 50,000 watt AM facilities serving the Houston area, the other being talk radio station 740 KTRH, owned by iHeartMedia, which runs 50,000 watts full-time.  Because AM 1180 is a clear channel frequency reserved for Class A WHAM in Rochester, New York, KGOL must reduce power at night to 3,000 watts to avoid interference.  KGOL uses a directional antenna at all times.  The transmitter is on Route 1314 in Porter, Texas, near Texas State Highway 99 (Grand Parkway).

History
KGOL debuted in 1983 as "1180 K-TUN", airing a middle of the road (MOR) format of popular adult music.  For a time it broadcasting in Motorola C-QUAM Stereo.  While KTUN was moderately successful in the Humble/Kingwood area, the signal was poor in most parts of Greater Houston during daylight operations, and at night was only listenable in Humble itself.

In 1986, FM Christian radio station KGOL, then at 107.3 in Lake Jackson, Texas, was sold and became Classic Rock "Z-107" KZFX on 107.5 FM (now KGLK). As a result, KGOL and its Christian format was moved to AM 1180, shifting the KGOL call sign from 107.3 to 1180 in the process.  KGOL's call letters stand for God Of Love.

KGOL has been a brokered facility for the majority of the last 20 years, having aired formats such as Business News "Biz Radio Network", South Asian formatted "Hum Tum City", several different variations of Spanish language talk and music, and Vietnamese programming.

In the mid-2010s, KGOL carried the ESPN Deportes Radio Network.  In mid-September 2017, ESPN Deportes moved to AM 1230 KCOH, when KGOL began carrying the Entravision Regional Mexican "La Tricolor" format.  But La Tricolor lasted only a few months as Entravision made sweeping changes to its stations across the U.S.  KGOL then shifted to its "La Suavecita" Spanish-language AC format.

On August 30, 2021, Entravision sold the station to FM Media Ventures, LLC, a company owned by Pakistani media and entertainment businessman Rehan Siddiqui. Siddiqui, who is the producer of "Hum Tum Radio", was recently blacklisted by the Indian Ministry of Home Affairs due to "terrorism" and "producing and funding anti-Indian propaganda".

References

External links

Texas State Government list of Houston-area radio stations

Asian-American culture in Houston
Indian-American culture in Texas
Pakistani-American culture in Texas
GOL
Radio stations established in 1992
1992 establishments in Texas